Dániel Juhász (born 17 May 1992) is a Hungarian football player who currently plays for Paksi SE.

Club statistics

Updated to games played as of 21 April 2013.

References
HLSZ
MLSZ

1992 births
Living people
Footballers from Budapest
Hungarian footballers
Association football defenders
Zalaegerszegi TE players
Paksi FC players
Nemzeti Bajnokság I players